Dozak or Dezak may refer to:
 Dezak, Chaharmahal and Bakhtiari
 Dezak-e Olya, Chaharmahal and Bakhtiari Province
 Dezak-e Sofla, Chaharmahal and Bakhtiari Province
 Dezak-e Sarcheshmeh, Chaharmahal and Bakhtiari Province
 Dezak, Fars
 Dezak, Khuzestan
 Dozak, Hormozgan
 Dozak, Kohgiluyeh and Boyer-Ahmad
 Dozak, Sistan and Baluchestan
 Dezak, South Khorasan

See also
 Dezg (disambiguation)
 Dozdak (disambiguation)